The 1988 Dutch Open was a Grand Prix men's tennis tournament staged at the Melkhuisje in Hilversum, Netherlands. The tournament was played on outdoor clay courts and was held from 25 July until 31 July 1988. It was the 30th edition of the tournament. Emilio Sánchez won the singles title.

Finals

Singles

 Emilio Sánchez defeated  Guillermo Pérez Roldán 6–3, 6–1, 3–6, 6–3

Doubles

 Sergio Casal /  Emilio Sánchez defeated.  Magnus Gustafsson /  Guillermo Pérez Roldán 7–6, 6–3

References

External links
 ITF tournament edition details

Dutch Open (tennis)
Dutch Open (tennis)
Dutch Open
Dutch Open
Dutch Open (tennis), 1988